Pandora's box refers to the container opened by the Greek mythological woman Pandora releasing all the evils of humanity into the world.

Pandora's box may also refer to:

Theatre, film and television
 Pandora's Box (play), a 1904 German play (Die Büchse der Pandora) by Frank Wedekind
 Pandora's Box (1929 film), a film by G. W. Pabst, starring Louise Brooks
 Pandora's Box (2008 film), a Turkish drama directed by Yeşim Ustaoğlu
 Pandora's Box (2017 film), a sci-fi television film starring Corin Nemec; originally titled Doomsday Device
 Trois 2: Pandora's Box, a 2002 erotic thriller directed by Rob Hardy
 Pandora's Box (British TV series), a 1992 documentary series by Adam Curtis
Pandora's Box (Chinese TV series), a 2021 mystery series
 "Pandora's Box", two-episodes story of the Mighty Max cartoon TV series
"Pandora's Box", a 2000 episode of the CBS series Touched by an Angel (season 6), the box used as a metaphor for the Internet.

Plot devices in other works
Pandora's Box, a feature on the eleventh season of the television series Big Brother
Pandora's box, represented as "The Pandorica", a box created to hold the Doctor in the 2010 Doctor Who episode "The Pandorica Opens"
Pandora's Box, a magical item featured in the Once Upon a Time episode "Dark Hollow"
Pandora's Box, present in the fourth season of the television series Warehouse 13
Pandora, a space box with cosmic power featured in Street Fighter X Tekken
Pandora Box, an extraterrestrial artifact to destroy numerous planets across the universe featured in Kamen Rider Build.
Pandora’s Box, the name of a safe house in from the Generator Rex episode "Mind Games".

Music
 Pandora's Box (band), a 1980s American female pop group created by Jim Steinman
 Pandora's Box (album), by Aerosmith, 1991
 "Pandora's Box" (Aerosmith song), 1974
 "Pandora's Box" (Orchestral Manoeuvres in the Dark song), 1991
 "Pandora's Box", a song by Donna Summer from Love to Love You Baby, 1975
 "Pandora's Box", a song by Edguy from Age of the Joker, 2011
 "Pandora's Box", a song by NCT 127 from Neo Zone, 2020
 "Pandora's Box", a song by Nonpoint from Nonpoint, 2012
 "Pandora's Box", a song by Procol Harum from Procol's Ninth, 1975
 "Pandora's Box", a song by J-Hope from Jack in the Box, 2022

Other
 Pandora's Box (BDSM), a studio in New York made famous by Nick Broomfield's documentary Fetishes
 Pandora's Box, a prison cell built on deck of HMS Pandora
 Pandora Box (company), a Japanese video game developer for several Super Nintendo Entertainment System games
 Pandora's Box (1999 video game), a computer game created by Microsoft
 Professor Layton and Pandora's Box, the second game in the Professor Layton series
Pandora Boxx, American drag queen
Pandora's Box (nightclub), a club in 1960s Los Angeles
Pandora Box (comics), a Franco-Belgian comics series written by Alcante

See also
 Pandora Spocks, the pseudonym of Samantha's cousin Serena on the TV show Bewitched
 Pandora (disambiguation)